The Vita Ædwardi Regis qui apud Westmonasterium Requiescit or simply Vita Ædwardi Regis is a Latin biography of King Edward the Confessor completed by an anonymous author  1067 and suspected of having been commissioned by Queen Edith, Edward's wife. Due to insecure dating and authorship, the reference to a "queen" in the prologue, however, may just as well refer to Queen Matilda. It survives in one manuscript, dated  1100, now in the British Library. The author is unknown, but was a servant of the queen and probably a Fleming. The most likely candidates are Goscelin and Folcard,  monks of St Bertin Abbey in St Omer.

It is a two-part text, the first dealing with England in the decades before the Norman Conquest (1066) and the activities of the family of Godwin, Earl of Wessex, and the second dealing with the holiness of King Edward. It is likely that the two parts were originally distinct. The first book is a secular history, not hagiography, although book ii is more hagiographic and was used as the basis of later saints' lives dedicated to the king, such as those by Osbert of Clare and Aelred of Rievaulx.

Manuscripts
There are two modern editions, those of Henry Richards Luard (1858) and Frank Barlow (1962, 1992). The Vita Ædwardi Regis survives in one manuscript, written in folios 38 to 57 of the British Library Harley MS 526, these twenty folios measuring c. 13 cm by 18.5 c and penned in "brownish ink". Written on the manuscript at a later date is the name of Richard Bancroft, Archbishop of Canterbury (1604–1610), who must therefore have acquired it. Its location prior to the life of Archbishop Bancroft is unclear, but possible locations include Canterbury itself, London Cathedral or the church of Westminster, as Bancroft had previously been a canon of Westminster as well as treasurer, prebendary and Bishop of London.

The Harley manuscript was probably written down at Christ Church, Canterbury around 1100, owing to the style of the hand. The two centre folios that originally lay between 40 and 41, and 54 and 55 are lost, though their content can be partially reconstructed. Its recent editor, historian Frank Barlow, thought that it was based on an earlier version of the text at Christ Church Canterbury by 1085; he also believed that other copies, now lost, existed at Westminster Abbey and Bury St Edmunds, from which derivative works were written.

Dating
Historian Frank Barlow characterised the dating of the Vita as "relatively simple" in comparison with other texts of the era. The latest event to be referred to in the text is the Battle of Hastings of 1066, and the work as a whole must have been completed before the death of Queen Edith and deposition of Archbishop Stigand, 1075 and 1070 respectively.

The work was likely commissioned by Queen Edith, to celebrate the deeds of her family, particularly her husband Edward, her father Earl Godwine of Wessex and her brothers Earls Tostig of Northumbria and Harold of Wessex. It is likely that the Queen had ordered the work following the model of her predecessor Emma of Normandy, who had commissioned a similar work, namely the Encomium Emmae Reginae. Historian J. L. Grassi argued that the author of the Vita had access to inside information, as a servant of the Queen.

There are two distinct sections to the work, book i and book ii, and the stages of composition of both were different. Book i is the core piece of historical narrative, perhaps the part commissioned by the queen. Although it ends with the death of King Edward, earlier parts of the text indicate that he was still alive; so although it was completed after the monarch's death, most of it was probably composed during his lifetime. Book i was not devoted to King Edward, who plays a relatively minor part in the narrative, but instead to Edith, her father and her brothers Harold and Tostig, and it was probably abandoned on their deaths in 1066, being resumed and edited later to take its place in the composite two-book work.

Book ii in contrast is relatively short, and is devoted to King Edward; it contains a list of miraculous or semi-miraculous events demonstrating Edward's sanctity and miracle-inducing powers. It was certainly written before the deposition of Archbishop Stigand, but Frank Barlow suggested that it may be more firmly datable to 1067.

Authorship
The author of the text is anonymous. Some things, however, are reasonably certain about the author. He was or had been in Holy Orders, either as monk or a clerk; he had been a servant of Queen Edith; and he was not English. It is highly unlikely that he was Norman, but  rather Flemish or Lotharingian. Flemish is most likely, as he mentions St Omer and Baldwin V, Count of Flanders, intimately, the latter three times. His spelling of place-names resembles the orthography characteristic of areas speaking Continental Germanic languages.

Barlow argued that the author can perhaps be identified either with Goscelin or Folcard (later Abbot of Thorney), both monks of St Bertin in St Omer. Both Flemings, the former arrived in England c. 1061 to join the service of Herman, Bishop of Wiltshire, while the latter came to England at an unknown date before 1069, perhaps before 1066. In 1943, historian Richard Southern had also postulated Goscelin as likely author, and this was the identification favoured by Antonia Gransden. The question is, however, still open, as the evidence for neither is conclusive.

The text
The Vita Ædwardi Regis is not particularly hagiographic, and is more comparable to works such as Asser's Vita Ælfredi (Life of King Alfred) or Einhard's Vita Karoli Magni (Life of Charlemagne) than to a saint's life. Frank Barlow thought its closest parallel was Vita Regis Rotberti Pii, a biographical narrative on the reign of Robert II the Pious, king of France, written sometime after 1031 by the Fleury monk Helgaud. Book i of the Vita Ædwardi Regis, the majority of the work, was not hagiographic at all. Osbert of Clare, who wrote the first true hagiography of King Edward, ignored book i and built his narrative around book ii. Book i is generally considered the more valuable section for modern historians. In the view of historian J. L. Grassi, it is the most valuable narrative source for the reign of Edward the Confessor, containing around 40 unique items of information. Book i is interspersed with poetry (largely absent from book ii), usually used as "transitional pieces" between different stages of the narrative.

As a source, the Vita Ædwardi Regis was drawn on by later medieval writers. William of Malmesbury consulted it, and his Gesta Regum contains extracts, as does Osbert of Clare's Vita. Sulcard's Prologus de Construccione Westmonasterii, written c. 1085, makes use of the work too, and it is this that enables historians to theorise that a copy of the Vita Ædwardi Regis was at the Abbey of Westminster by this date. More use of the text, if indirect, was made by the famous Cistercian Northumbrian, Aelred of Rievaulx. Ailred's Vita S. Eduardi Regis et Confessoris was the most widely circulated  hagiography of Edward, and all later accounts of Edward's miracles and life are based on this. Book iv of Richard of Cirencester's Speculum Historiale de Gestis Regum Angliae is a compilation based on the Vita by Aelred, and contains extracts of the Vita Ædwardi Regis, some of which – roughly 500 words regarding Edith's marriage to Edward – are unique and probably represent part of the lost sections of the original Vita Ædwardi Regis.

Notes

References

 
 
 
 

 

1067 books
11th-century history books
11th-century manuscripts
Medieval Latin historical texts
Latin biographies
11th-century Latin books
Works published anonymously
British Library collections
Edward the Confessor
British biographies